The 2010 Turkish census was held in 2010 and recorded the population and demographic details of every settlement in Turkey.

Censuses in Turkey
2010 in Turkey
Turkey